Kim Dong-hyun (Hangul: 김동현; born 12 November 1987) is a South Korean bobsledder who has competed since 2008. At the 2010 Winter Olympics in Vancouver, he finished 19th in the four-man event.

Career
Kim finished 30th in the two-man event at the FIBT World Championships 2009 in Lake Placid, New York. His best World Cup finish was 26th in the two-man event at Whistler, British Columbia in 2009.

At the 2018 Winter Olympics in Pyeongchang, the South Korean four-man team of Seo Young-woo, Won Yun-jong, Jun Jung-lin, and Kim Dong-hyun won a surprising silver medal in the four-man event, tying with a German team led by Nico Walther. With the silver medal, South Korea became the first Asian nation to claim an Olympic medal in a bobsleigh event.

References

External links

1987 births
Living people
Bobsledders at the 2010 Winter Olympics
Bobsledders at the 2014 Winter Olympics
Bobsledders at the 2018 Winter Olympics
Bobsledders at the 2022 Winter Olympics
Olympic bobsledders of South Korea
South Korean male bobsledders
Sportspeople from Seoul
Olympic medalists in bobsleigh
Olympic silver medalists for South Korea
Medalists at the 2018 Winter Olympics